Evans Metropolitan AME Zion Church is a historic African Methodist Episcopal church located at 301 N. Cool Spring Street in Fayetteville, Cumberland County, North Carolina. It was built in 1893–1894, and is a five bay, rectangular brick building in the Gothic Revival style. The front facade features flanking towers.  Also on the property is a contributing house built in 1913 used as an office/administration building.  It is a two-story frame house with a hipped roof and wraparound porch.

It was listed on the National Register of Historic Places in 1983.

References

African-American history of North Carolina
Churches in Fayetteville, North Carolina
African Methodist Episcopal Zion churches in North Carolina
Churches on the National Register of Historic Places in North Carolina
Churches completed in 1894
19th-century Methodist church buildings in the United States
National Register of Historic Places in Cumberland County, North Carolina